is a species of flowering plant in the family Saxifragaceae that is endemic to Amami Ōshima in the Amami Islands of  Kagoshima Prefecture, Japan.

Taxonomy
Discovered by researchers on Amami Ōshima in March 2011, the species was first described, as Mitella amamiana,  by Japanese botanist Yudai Okuyama in 2016. Asimitellaria, a section erected by Michio Wakabayashi in the genus Mitella in 2001, was elevated to genus rank in 2021, the new combination being Asimitellaria amamiana. The specific epithet relates to the type locality (Amami Ōshima) in the Amami Islands.

Description
It is similar to but somewhat larger than Asimitellaria doiana, endemic to Yakushima (north of the Tokara Gap), previously believed to be the southernmost domestic species of the genus, which is characterized as having "low dispersability.

Conservation status
Found in a restricted range on only one island and with a population estimated at less than 1,000, Mitella amamiana (the basionym) is classed as Critically Endangered on the Ministry of the Environment Red List. As of 2016, the only botanical garden in the world where the species could be found was the Tsukuba Botanical Garden in Ibaraki Prefecture, although there were plans to propagate and distribute the plant to other botanical gardens in Japan, to reduce the likelihood of extinction.

See also
 Amami Guntō National Park

References

amamiana
Flora of the Ryukyu Islands
Endemic flora of Japan
Plants described in 2016
Amami Islands